Savimex Corp (SAV:VN) is a wooden furniture manufacturer and home construction company based in Ho Chi Minh City, Vietnam.  The company processes timber, makes furniture, manages brand names and exports furniture to Japan, the EU and the United States.  It buys, imports and works woods such as eucalyptus, rubber, oak and beech.  Its furniture products include tables, chairs, shelving units, beds, dining room sets, bedroom sets and more.

Business units and brand names of Savimex Group include:
SaviWoodtech - furniture making facility in Thu Duc District, Ho Chi Minh
SaviDecor - furniture and interior decoration including clients such as hotels, apartment complexes, office buildings
SaviHomes - build homes and apartment buildings, manage real estate
Satimex - furniture for export and deal in woodworking supplies like abrasive cloth and paint

External links
Savimex Company site
Savimex at Alacrastore
Savimex at Bloomberg
Savimex at Google finance
Savimex at Ho Chi Minh Securities Trading Center

References

Companies listed on the Ho Chi Minh City Stock Exchange
Furniture companies of Vietnam
Vietnamese brands
Manufacturing companies based in Ho Chi Minh City